Macrocheles is a genus of mites in the family Macrochelidae. There are more than 80 described species in Macrocheles.

Species
These 81 species belong to the genus Macrocheles:

 Macrocheles analis (Hyatt & Emberson)
 Macrocheles baliensis Takaku & Hartini, 2001
 Macrocheles beieri Johnston, 1970
 Macrocheles bertrandi
 Macrocheles caelatus Berlese
 Macrocheles carinatus (C.L.Koch, 1839)
 Macrocheles chaetopus Petrova, 1967
 Macrocheles coenosus Takaku, 1996
 Macrocheles craspedochetes Glida & Bertrand, 2003
 Macrocheles dayaci Dwibadra & Takaku, 2014
 Macrocheles decoloratus (C.L.Koch, 1839)
 Macrocheles dentatus (Evans & Browning, 1956)
 Macrocheles depuncta Petrova, 1967
 Macrocheles embersoni
 Macrocheles evansi (Balogh, 1958)
 Macrocheles falsiglaber Glida & Bertrand, 2003
 Macrocheles glaber (J.Müller, 1860)
 Macrocheles goncharovae Bregetova, 1977
 Macrocheles hamatus Oudemans, 1915
 Macrocheles hoffmannae
 Macrocheles insignitus (Berlese)
 Macrocheles ivanovi Bregetova & Koroleva, 1960
 Macrocheles jabarensis Hartini & Takaku, 2003
 Macrocheles jonggolensis Hartini & Takaku, 2003
 Macrocheles kaiju Knee, 2017
 Macrocheles lagodekhensis Bregetova & Koroleva, 1960
 Macrocheles laiae Tseng, 1989
 Macrocheles lisae Niogret & Nicot, 2007
 Macrocheles lumareti Niogret & Nicot, 2008
 Macrocheles lundae Krantz
 Macrocheles magnus Tseng, 1989
 Macrocheles mammifer Berlese, 1918
 Macrocheles matrius (Hull, 1925)
 Macrocheles merdarius (A.Berlese, 1889)
 Macrocheles minervae Cicolani, 1982
 Macrocheles montanus (C.Willmann, 1951)
 Macrocheles monticola Takaku & Hartini, 2001
 Macrocheles montivagus Berlese, 1887
 Macrocheles muscaedomesticae (Scopoli, 1772)
 Macrocheles nataliae Bregetova & Koroleva, 1960
 Macrocheles neglectus Bregetova, 1977
 Macrocheles nemoralis Hull, 1925
 Macrocheles niksarensis Özbek, 2017
 Macrocheles opacus (Koch, 1839)
 Macrocheles ovoidalis
 Macrocheles palustris Hull, 1925
 Macrocheles pannosus Hull, 1925
 Macrocheles parmulatus Hull, 1925
 Macrocheles paucipectinatus Niogret & Nicot, 2007
 Macrocheles pavlovskii Bregetova & Koroleva, 1960
 Macrocheles penicilliger (Berlese, 1904)
 Macrocheles peniculatus Berlese, 1918
 Macrocheles perglaber Filipponi & Pegazzano, 1962
 Macrocheles pisentii (Berlese, 1882)
 Macrocheles pontina Filipponi & Pegazzano, 1960
 Macrocheles praedafimetorum
 Macrocheles pratum Knee, 2017
 Macrocheles punctatissimus Berlese
 Macrocheles punctoscutatus G.O.Evans & Browning, 1956
 Macrocheles recki Bregetova & Koroleva, 1960
 Macrocheles reductus Petrova, 1966
 Macrocheles riparius Dwibadra & Takaku, 2014
 Macrocheles robustulus (Berlese, 1904)
 Macrocheles roquensis Mendes & Lizaso, 1992
 Macrocheles rotundiscutis Bregetova & Koroleva, 1960
 Macrocheles saceri Costa, 1967
 Macrocheles scutatus (Berlese)
 Macrocheles scutiformis
 Macrocheles seraphim Niogret & Nicot, 2007
 Macrocheles subbadius (A.Berlese, 1904)
 Macrocheles subcoenosus Takaku, 1996
 Macrocheles submarginatus Foa, 1900
 Macrocheles submotus Falconer, 1924
 Macrocheles sukabumiensis Hartini & Takaku, 2003
 Macrocheles tardus (C.L.Koch, 1841)
 Macrocheles terreus (Canestrini & Fanzago)
 Macrocheles transbaicalicus Bregetova & Koroleva, 1960
 Macrocheles tridentinus G. & R.Canestrini, 1884
 Macrocheles vagabundus (Berlese, 1889)
 Macrocheles wainensis Dwibadra & Takaku, 2014
 Macrocheles willowae Knee, 2017

References

External links

 

Macrochelidae
Macrocheles
Articles created by Qbugbot